Mr. P may refer to:

Mr. P (album), a live album by Patrice O'Neal
Mr. P (singer) (born 1981), Nigerian singer, songwriter and producer Peter Okoye